The Chinese Muslim Cultural and Fraternal Association (CMCFA) is an Islamic organisation in Hong Kong, with around 250,000 members. The group currently operates five different schools in Hong Kong.

The head office is in Wan Chai.

History
The association was founded in 1922 at 7 Chan Tong Lane, Wan Chai. It was then incorporated as a charity organisation in 1963.

Activities
The association not only conduct religious activities related to the Chinese Muslims, but they also manage and maintain six non-profit schools: one college, two primary schools and three kindergartens.

See also
 Islam in China
 Islam in Hong Kong

References

External links
  

1922 establishments in Hong Kong
Islamic organisations based in Hong Kong
Islamic organizations established in 1922